Ammonium benzoate, a white powder-like substance, is the ammonium salt of benzoic acid. This compound is prepared by the reaction of benzoic acid and ammonia.

References

Ammonium compounds
Benzoates